The Great Adventure is a 1953 Swedish drama film directed by Arne Sucksdorff.

Cast
 Gunnar Sjöberg as Narrator (Anders as an adult) (voice)
 Luis Van Rooten as Narrator (Anders as an adult) (U.S. version) (voice)
 Anders Nohrborg as Anders
 Kjell Sucksdorff as Kjell
 Holger Stockman as KvastasEmil
 Arne Sucksdorff as Father
 Amanda Haglund as Grandmother
 Annika Ekedahl as Annika
 Aina Fritzell as Teacher
 Stina Andersson as Mother
 Erik Bodin as Store Keeper
 Sigvard Kihlgren as Jens
 Norman Shelley as Narrator

Awards
Won
 4th Berlin International Film Festival: Big Silver Medal (Documentaries and Culture Films)

Nominated
 1954 Cannes Film Festival: Palme d'Or

References

External links

1953 films
1953 drama films
Swedish drama films
1950s Swedish-language films
Swedish black-and-white films
Films directed by Arne Sucksdorff
Films about children
Films about foxes
Films about otters
Films scored by Lars-Erik Larsson
1950s Swedish films